Huby is an Indonesian and French surname. Notable people with the name include:
 Anne-Marie Huby (1966), Belgian businesswoman
 Craig Huby (1986), English rugby league footballer
 Pamela Huby (1922–2019), British philosopher

References 

Indonesian-language surnames
French-language surnames
Toponymic surnames